Jabez Vodrey (1795–1861) was the first English potter to emigrate to and work west of the Appalachian Mountains in the United States.

Early years
Vodrey was born on 14 January 1795  in Tunstall, Staffordshire, a centuries-old centre of the English pottery industry. He is thought to be a cousin of Frederick Vodrey, who emigrated from Staffordshire to Dublin, Ireland in the late 19th century and founded an art pottery.

Emigration and first American potteries
In 1827, Vodrey and his wife, Sarah Nixon Vodrey, emigrated to Pittsburgh, Pennsylvania, United States, with another Staffordshire potter, William Frost.  Vodrey and Frost operated a pottery in Pittsburgh for about two years.  In 1829, Vodrey moved alone to Louisville, Kentucky, where he continued to work as a potter for the next decade.  In 1839, he moved to Troy, Indiana on the Ohio River, where he took over the operation of the abandoned pottery of James Clews.  It was not a success, as skilled labour was almost impossible to procure.

Years in East Liverpool, Ohio
In March 1847, Vodrey came to East Liverpool, Ohio, where he found work in the area's booming pottery industry.  He began with the manufacture of clay smoking pipes, and by 1848 had formed a partnership with William Woodward, a wealthy farmer.  Together, the two men produced simple yellow ware and Rockingham Pottery.  Within months, their small pottery was destroyed by fire, but the men began to rebuild the pottery with the financial backing of brothers James and John Simpson Blakely.

The new pottery of Woodward, Blakely and Company called its ware Phoenix, in honor of their success in rising from the ashes of the pottery Woodward and Vodrey had founded together.  By 1852, the company employed more than six dozen workers in five buildings.  A series of serious setbacks, including an Ohio River flood and a strike, decimated the business and by the end of 1857, it was essentially defunct.

Meanwhile, Vodrey's sons William, James and John were busy converting an abandoned East Liverpool church into a pottery.  By the spring of 1858, the Vodrey and Brother Pottery Company was operating at full capacity, producing Rockingham and yellow ware.

Later life
Jabez Vodrey died in 1861. His son John Wadsworth Vodrey was killed in the Battle of New Hope Church, Georgia while fighting for the Union Army's 46th Pennsylvania Infantry on 25 May 1864.  Despite these setbacks, the family pottery prospered for an additional six decades.  In 1876, the pottery began production of white ironstone.  In 1896, it changed its name to the Vodrey Pottery Company and semi-porcelain became part of its range.  Until it closed in 1928, Vodrey Pottery produced domestic and commercial dinnerware and chamber ware.

Vodrey and his wife, Sarah Nixon Vodrey, are buried at East Liverpool's Riverview Cemetery.  Descendants of the Vodrey family remain in the area.

External links
Vodrey Pottery Works price list, East Liverpool, Ohio 1864 - 1865
Museum Of Ceramics
Riverview Cemetery

1794 births
1861 deaths
American potters
People from Tunstall, Staffordshire
People from East Liverpool, Ohio